Orlando Teani (24 June 1910 – 3 June 1972) was an Italian racing cyclist. He rode in the 1935 Tour de France.

References

External links
 

1910 births
1972 deaths
Italian male cyclists
People from Massa
Sportspeople from the Province of Massa-Carrara
Cyclists from Tuscany